Anaea may refer to:

 Anaea (Asia), an ancient city and present Catholic see in Turkey
 Anaea (butterfly), a genus in the Anaeini tribe of butterflies
 Anaea, an Amazon